Columbia Records 1958–1986 is a Johnny Cash compilation album released on Columbia Records in 1987 to commemorate the 28 years Cash (who had recently left Columbia for Mercury Records) recorded with the label, featuring 20 tracks dating from 1958 to 1986. This album contains many of Cash's famous hits, including Ring Of Fire and Folsom Prison Blues, as well as some of his less-known recordings, such as Seasons of My Heart and Without Love.  The album failed to chart, and none of the selections were released as singles.

Track listing

References

1987 compilation albums
Johnny Cash compilation albums
Columbia Records compilation albums